Natsamrāt (roughly translated as: The King of Theater or The Emperor of Actors) is a 2016 Indian Marathi-language drama film starring Nana Patekar in the leading role. Based on a play by the same written by playwright Kusumagraj,  the film depicts the tragic family life of a stage actor who has retired from acting but is unable to forget his fond memories of theatre and the stage.

It is directed by Mahesh Manjrekar and produced by Nana Patekar and Vishwas Joshi under the banner of Great Maratha Entertainment, Gajanan Chitra and Fincraft Media and Entertainment Pvt. Ltd. The film was officially released in India on 1 January 2016 and became the highest-grossing Marathi film at the time, until Sairat occupied that place. The film was made in Gujarati in 2018 as Natsamrat and is being made in Telugu with the title Rangamarthanda.

Plot

The film is a tragedy about a veteran theatre actor Ganpat Ramchandra Belwalkar, also known as, Appa (played by Nana Patekar) who has been an acclaimed theatre actor during his days, garnering fame and fortune by acting in plays based on various works, especially those of William Shakespeare. He wins the award and the highest title of Natsamrat.

Subsequently, Appa bequeaths all of his wealth to his children. He never keeps anything to himself and expresses his views very frankly. He does not mind using expletives while expressing his views. Only his wife Kaveri (Medha Manjrekar), whom he fondly calls 'Sarkar', and his close friend Rambhau (Vikram Gokhale) are able to understand his nature. His daughter-in-law Neha (Neha Pendse) and son Makrand (Ajit Parab) do not seem to appreciate his frank nature, which at times causes embarrassing situations for them when they have visitors or when their daughter hurls expletives at school. The breaking point in their relationship comes when their granddaughter performs a folk dance taught by Appa, which is not appreciated by her mother Neha. An argument follows between them and when they return home, Neha slaps her daughter. The next day, Neha proposes to part ways with them by moving out, a ploy through which she anticipates that Appa will grant them their space. Appa sees through her plan and decides to move out while remarking to his son, "The whole world is a stage, and unfortunately, my part is a sad one."

Appa's wife Kaveri is very devoted to him and she does not question his decision. They move to their son-in-law and daughter Vidya's place. Appa continues with his carefree and frank ways, at times laden with few expletives. Their son-in-law, Rahul Barve (Sunil Barve) is a high-ranking engineer in his company and is of a caring nature. Vidya (Mrunmayee Deshpande) also confronts similar embarrassing situations as Neha, but her husband Rahul does not seem to mind it. He appreciates Appa's poetry (To be or not to be, that is the question) and his fluent style of recitals. On Vidya's anniversary, Appa comes in an inebriated state and embarrasses Rahul's boss. Although next-day Appa apologizes, Rahul does not seem to mind it and discards it as a one-off incident.

Meanwhile, Appa remembers about his friend Rambhau and pays a visit to him. Rambhau is devastated after the demise of his wife Kumud. He lashes out at Appa for leaving him alone in his final days. The scene that follows is a heart-touching conversation between Karna and Krishna enacted by Rambhau and Appa respectively while Rambhau is lying on his hospital bed. Mesmerized by Rambhau's performance and pitying his condition, Appa grants Rambhau his last wish.

The next day Appa returns to his son-in-law's house. Kaveri tells Appa that Rambhau had overdosed on sleeping pills and that he is no more to which Appa confesses that he gave the pills to him implying that, it was his last wish.

On another occasion, Appa insults Rahul's boss's son when he could not stand his weak adaption of Othello. This irritates Vidya and she confronts her father. She makes their arrangement in her outhouse; however, her husband still stands by Appa and regards this as a non-issue. Vidya makes sure that the outhouse is well maintained and they are taken good care of.

One fine day Vidya misplaces cash given to her by her husband and in a turn of events, she accuses her parents of stealing it. This creates a rift between them. Vidya realizes her mistake later when she finds the money. She apologizes to her parents but it is too late as Appa and Kaveri have already decided to move out. Vidya's husband Rahul is still sympathetic with her parents but cannot change their hearts. On that night, they escape from the outhouse for their ancestral village where they have an old house in a dilapidated state. On the way, they halt at a village, where Kaveri dies of fever. Appa is destroyed by this loss. He is supported by a boot polishwala named Raja. Raja is extremely poor and a homeless person who lives with his family under a bridge. Appa is at times in a delusional state and suffers from the fact that the grandeur with which he had lived as an actor is now making his pain unbearable in his state of loneliness and poverty. Appa serves tea at a tea stall where he enthralls his customers with his poetry recitals and dialogue from his plays. A man named Siddharth(Sarang Sathaye), who has respect and great fondness for acting, continuously follows Appa, since, for Siddharth, he is a noble actor and an idol. Appa hides his real identity from Siddharth and refuses to acknowledge that he is 'Natsamrat'. Siddarth, however, continues with his conviction regarding Appa being the great actor.

One day, Appa reads in the papers that his favorite theatre had burnt down in a fire. He goes there immediately and is completely shattered to see the theatre reduced to ashes. Siddharth also arrives there as he was following Appa. Here Appa starts reliving his old memories and also accepts Siddharth's claim that he is the real Natsamrat Ganpatrao when Siddharth reveals that he knew all about him and his past. His family and Raja also come there to find him. They request him to come home with him and to live with them but he refuses. The film ends magnificently albeit it has a tragic end. Appa is in a delusional state and shuffles between reality and the great personalities he had once portrayed as an actor on the very same stage. He gives his last performance on the theatre stage for Siddharth and says that "Do you understand, dear Siddarth, this is what theatre acting is all about? To fulfill one's longing"
He unexpectedly screams by placing a hand on his throat and collapses. Immediately everyone runs to hold him, but they find that he has already departed.

Cast
 Nana Patekar as Ganpat Ramchandra Belwalkar/ Natsamrat/ Appa /Baba
 Medha Manjrekar as Kaveri Ganpat Belwalkar/Sarkar
 Vikram Gokhale as Rambhau
 Mrunmayee Deshpande as Vidya Ganpat Belwalkar/Vidya Rahul Barve, Ganpat's daughter
 Ajit Parab as Makrand Ganpat Belwalkar, Ganpat's son
 Neha Pendse as Neha Makrand Belwalkar
 Sunil Barve as Rahul Barve / Vidya's husband
 Sarang Sathaye as Siddharth
 Pranjal Parab
 Sarita Malpekar
 Vidya Patwardhan
 Jaywant Wadkar
 Nilesh Divekar
 Sandeep Pathak

Also featuring in guest appearances are Jitendra Joshi, Aniket Vishwasrao, Pooja Sawant and Neha Mahajan

Details
The film is the screen adaptation of noted Marathi playwright Kusumagraj’s iconic Marathi play "Natsamrat" which was first staged in 1970. Dr. Shriram Lagoo has acted in the Marathi play in the role of Natsamrat for a very long time. The film also features Vikram Gokhale, Medha Manjrekar, Mrunmayee Deshpande, Sunil Barve, Neha Pendse and Ajit Parab in supporting roles.

Soundtrack
Music for this film is composed by Ajit Parab. Lyrics are by V.V. Shirwadkar a.k.a. Kusumagraj and Guru Thakur.

Release
The film was released on 1 January 2016, which is also the birthday of Nana Patekar. Apart from Maharashtra, Natsamrat released in Gujarat, Goa, Madhya Pradesh, Karnataka, Delhi, Telangana and West Bengal with nearly 1,600 shows across more than 400 screens in the country daily. It also had special screenings in countries like UK, Singapore, Canada, USA till March 2016. Even in its 6th week it was running successfully in 174 theaters with 2,225 daily shows all over Maharashtra.

Reception
The film received praise for its portrayal of the angst of an aged veteran theater actor. Film critics praised the movie for acting skills, direction, cinematography and script. The film received overwhelming response at the box office, and ran for more than 50 days across Maharashtra.

Box office
Later Sairat broke Natsamrat's record and became the highest-grossing film in Marathi.

Accolades
 Best Marathi Film Award
 Best Marathi Film- 
 Filmfare Marathi Awards

Nana Patekar – Best Actor – Nominated
Medha Manjrekar – Best Actress – Nominated.
Vikram Gokhale – Best Supporting Actor

Zee Gaurav Puraskar
Best Director – Mahesh Manjrekar
Best Actor – Nana Patekar

See also
 Highest grossing Marathi films
 Natsamrat, 2018 Gujarati film

References

External links
 

2016 films
Indian drama films
2016 drama films
Indian films based on plays
Films directed by Mahesh Manjrekar
Marathi films remade in other languages
2010s Marathi-language films
Films about actors